WKGR (98.7 FM) is a classic rock station licensed to Wellington, Florida and serving the West Palm Beach market. WKGR's signal can be picked up as far north as Melbourne, as far west as Moore Haven, and usually  no further south than highway 595 in Fort Lauderdale. Its transmitter is located on the west side of Jonathan Dickinson State Park in Hobe Sound. Also sharing WKGR's transmitter tower are stations WIRK (which itself was a primary competitor of WKGR before moving its rock programming to an HD Radio subchannel) and WMBX.

WKGR previously simulcast the programming of sister station WJNO on its HD2 subchannel starting in September 2010; by 2013 this was replaced with the signal of Christian rock station WREH. WKGR later went to classic country on HD2, and in 2019, dropped its HD2 subchannel. Then on January 19, 2021, WKGR brought back its HD2 subchannel with its original programming, simulcasting WJNO. A few weeks later, sister station WBZT began simulcasting on its HD2 subchannel, with WJNO moving to the HD2 subchannel of sister station WLDI.

Morning programming
WKGR:
WKGR has survived as one of the remaining few stations in Florida that still play the Classic Rock format. Big Rig airs in mornings from the Tampa affiliate, while Buck McWilliams now handles middays.  Original cast member Andy Preston airs in afternoon drive, and Sixx Sense airs in the evenings.

The most popular, controversial, and highest rated Morning Show in WKGR history was the SEA BASS and GLORIA Show in the mid-late 1990s. Family friendly BUCK and PEG Morning Show was reasonably popular for several years as well, as was MARK FROST in the 1980s.

After several station sales, Clear Channel- now IHEART MEDIA took over and held fast the Classic Rock format that continues its stronghold on South Florida radio ratings.

External links
Station website

KGR
Classic rock radio stations in the United States
Radio stations established in 1997
Wellington, Florida
IHeartMedia radio stations
1997 establishments in Florida